Camp Justice may refer to:

Camp Justice (Iraq), a military base in Iraq
Camp Justice (Diego Garcia), a US base in the disputed Chagos Archipelago
Camp Justice (Guantanamo) the complex where captives will face charges before the Guantanamo military commissions.